() is a basic upper garment of the , a traditional Korean garment, which has been worn by both men and women. It covers the arms and upper part of the wearer's body.

Etymology

Although it is unknown when the term  began to be used to refer to the garment, it is assumed to have appeared in the late Goryeo period around King Chungnyeol's reign. However, it is not clear whether the record is a hanja (Chinese character) transliteration of a Korean word or Mongolian influence.

Composition

Modern Korean designers sometimes use other materials such as lace. There are several types of  according to fabric, sewing technique, and shape.

The  is a removable white collar placed over the end of the git and is generally squared off. Women's  may have , a different coloured cuff placed on the end of the sleeves. The form of  has been changed as time goes by.

History 
Previously in Korea,  were worn over bottom garments.

The original silhouette for Hanbok  shared similarities with the clothing of the ancient nomadic people of Eurasia due to the cultural exchanges that ancient Koreans had with the Scythians. The ancient  had an open form, a collar which crossed to the left, narrow sleeves, and was hip-length which were similar features found in the Scythian clothing-style. The  initially closed with the front, central closure; it then changed to left closure before changing again to right closure. The closure to the right became an accepted standard since the sixth century AD.

The  of the Ruling class of Silla was influenced from Chinese fashions of Tang influence in the Silla Dynasty by Kim Chun-Chu (648CE). But the most commoners wore only a style of indigenous  distinct from that of the Ruling class of Silla.

During the Goryeo Period (918–1392),  became shorter, with slimmer sleeves.

Joseon 
In the Joseon Period,  lengths and style fluctuated depending on current fashion and social standing.

In the 16th century, women's  were long, wide, and covered the waist. The length of women's  gradually shortened. This was to fit in style with a large wig and skirt.

Modern styles 
In contemporary Korea, the sumptuary laws within different social classes were lifted and colours, decorations, and fabrics that were exclusive to the upper classes were open to all classes. This allowed for the growth of diverse traditional design elements in  styles. However, in the 20th and 21st centuries, the traditional Korean clothing has not been worn every day by most people. The  became more reserved for special events, such as ceremonial or bridal wear, which carries onto current time. During their own engagement celebrations, women may wear pink . After they are married, women may wear indigo .  Additionally, modern silhouettes are commonly slimmer and more simplified than historical styles.

Gallery

See also
Chima jeogori
Dangui
Dopo
Durumagi
Hanbok
Jeonbok
Po
Sagyusam

References

External links

Korean clothing
Tops (clothing)